is a Japanese animation director of hentai films such as La Blue Girl and Twin Angels, as well as direct-to-video adaptations of erotic games such as Teacher's Pet, Words Worth and First Kiss Story. His real name is Kiyomu Fukuda.

Filmography
 La Blue Girl (1992 OVA), Director
 Lady Blue (1994 OVA), Director
 New Angel (1994 OVA), Drawing Continuity (ep 2)
 Twin Angels (1995 OVA), Director
 Mystery of Nonomura Hospital (1996 OVA), Supervision
 Advancer Tina (1997 OVA), Director
 Pia Carrot 2 (1998 OVA), Director
 Teacher's Pet (1999 OVA), Director
 Kakyuusei (1999 TV series), Storyboard (ep 1), Episode Director (ep 7)
 Words Worth (1999 OVA), Director, Storyboard (eps 1, 2, 4, 5)
 First Kiss Story (2000 OVA), Director
 Inma Seiden (2001 OVA), Director
 La Blue Girl Returns (2001 OVA), Supervision
 Class Reunion Again (2002 OVA), Director
 Taboo Charming Mother (2003 OVA), Director

External links
 
 Kan Fukumoto anime at Media Arts Database 

Anime directors
Living people
Year of birth missing (living people)